The House of Cramm (originally also von Kram, von Cramme or von Crammen) is a noted German noble family of the Uradel and one of the oldest noble houses of Lower Saxony.

History 
According to a source from 1774, the family came to the area of the bishopric of Hildesheim around 815 with the Carolingian Emperor Louis I and was granted estates there by him. However, the family is first verifiably documented in 1150 with Dietrich von Cramme. The Cramms were a wealthy knightly family and respected feudatories of the ecclesiastical and secular rulers of the region. From a very early start in their history, the family held high positions at their respective courts. From 1250 on they were the hereditary chamberlains of the Duchy of Brunswick-Lüneburg and from 1294 to 1589 the hereditary cup-bearers of the Prince-Bishopric of Hildesheim. In later centuries family members served the House of Welf as generals, chamberlains and ministers. They held the title of Freiherr (Baron) and owned multiple estates of which the castles of Bodenburg, Brüggen and Oelber are still in their possession.

Notable members of the family 
Armgard von Cramm (1883–1971), Mother of Prince Bernhard of Lippe-Biesterfeld and grandmother of Beatrix of the Netherlands
 Asche von Cramm (also Aschwin IV., Ascanius, Assa von Cramm; approx. 1480–1528), famous warrior and military leader of the Reformation period, field marshal to Prince-elector John of Saxony and friend of Martin Luther. At his suggestion, Luther wrote "Ob Kriegsleute auch in seligem Stande sein können" (Whether Soldiers, Too, Can Be Saved), which appeared in 1526. He gained special fame for his bravery in battle, but also for his good nature and piety. 
 John Cram (1596 -1682), First Cram in America, signatory of the 1639 Exeter Compact which established the colonial government in New Hampshire and original land grant holder in Brookline, Massachusetts. 
 Aschwin von Sierstorpff-Cramm (1846-1909), Hereditary chamberlain of the Duke of Brunswick. Later he served as Master of the Horse for the Sultan of the Ottoman Empire and received the title of Pasha.
 Ralph Adams Cram  (1863 -1942), Prolific and influential architect of collegiate and ecclesiastical buildings.
 Ralph Warren Cram  (1869 -1952), Publisher, journalist and aviator.
 Gottfried von Cramm (1909–1976), German tennis champion who won the French Open twice and reached the final of a Grand Slam in five other occasions. He was ranked number 2 in the world in 1934 and 1936, and number 1 in the world in 1937. His refusal to work with the Nazi regime got him briefly jailed in 1938.
 Helga von Cramm (1840–1919), German and Swiss painter, illustrator and graphic artist  
 Eloise Blaine Cram (1896 -1957), Zoologist and parasitologist.  
 Ludolf von Cramme (documented in 1246), first hereditary chamberlain of the Duchy of Brunswick

Estates

References

External links
 Genealogisches Handbuch des Adels, Adelslexikon Band II, Band 58 der Gesamtreihe, C. A. Starke Verlag, Limburg (Lahn) 1974, ISSN 0435-2408
 Allgemeines Teutsches Adels-Lexicon: Darinn von d. alten u. neuen Gräfl.-Freyherrl.- u. Adelichen Familien ... gehandelt wird. Fuchs, 1774

German noble families
Lower Saxon noble families